Campbell County Public Schools is a school district which serves Campbell County, Tennessee, United States. It is based in Jacksboro, Tennessee.

Schools
Campbell County Comprehensive High School
Caryville Elementary School
Elk Valley Elementary School
Jacksboro Elementary School
Jacksboro Middle School
Jellico Elementary School
Jellico High School
LaFollette Elementary School
LaFollette Middle School
Valley View Elementary School
White Oak Elementary School
Wynn Habersham Elementary School

References

External links
 Campbell County Public Schools Official site

School districts in Tennessee
Education in Campbell County, Tennessee